Marina Arrate Palma (Osorno, February 14, 1957) is a Chilean poet and clinic psychologist.

She studied psychology at the Pontifical Catholic University of Chile and a master at the University of Concepción.

She started publishing in 1985 in LAR publications before going back to Santiago where she founded the publishing house Libros de la Elipse. She has also been a teacher and a professor in several centres such as the Metropolitan University of Technology or the Gender and Culture Centre in Latin America (CEGECAL) within the University of Chile.

Works 

 Este Lujo de Ser, 1986, Editorial LAR, Concepción.
 Máscara Negra, 1990, Editorial LAR, Concepción.
 Tatuaje, 1992, Editorial LAR, Concepción.
 Compilación de su Obra Publicada, 1996, Editorial Tierra Firme, Buenos Aires, Argentina.
 Uranio, 1999, Editorial LOM, Santiago.
 Trapecio, 2002, Editorial LOM, Santiago.
 El Libro del Componedor, 2008, Sello Editorial Libros de la Elipse, Santiago.
 Satén, 2009, Editorial Pen Press, New York.
 Carta a Don Alonso de Ercilla y Zúñiga, Memoria Poética. Reescrituras de la Araucana, 2010

Prizes 

 Premio Municipal de Poesía de Santiago 2003 for Trapecio.

External links 

  Poemas de Marina Arrate
  Reseñas, presentaciones, artículos y otros

1957 births
Living people
Chilean psychologists
Chilean women psychologists
University of Concepción alumni
20th-century Chilean poets
Chilean women poets
21st-century Chilean poets
20th-century Chilean women writers
21st-century Chilean women writers